Melky-Jerede Ndokomandji (born 4 September 1997) is a Central African footballer who plays as a midfielder for Olympic Real and the Central African Republic national team.

International career
Ndokomandji debuted with the senior Central African Republic national team in a 1–0 2021 Africa Cup of Nations loss to Mauritania on 30 March 2021.

References

External links
 
 

1997 births
Living people
People from Bangui
Central African Republic footballers
Central African Republic international footballers
Association football midfielders